José Augusto Vargas Fernández is a Peruvian politician and a former Congressman representing Loreto for the 2006–2011 term. Vargas belongs to the Peruvian Aprista Party.

External links
Official Congressional Site

Living people
Year of birth missing (living people)
American Popular Revolutionary Alliance politicians
Members of the Congress of the Republic of Peru